M. Vidanalange Ishan Bandara (born 16 May 1991) is a Sri Lankan male boxer who generally competes in flyweight category.

Ishan Bandara made his Commonwealth Games debut at the 2018 Commonwealth Games representing Sri Lanka and claimed a bronze medal in the men's 52kg event after losing the semi-final bout to India's Gaurav Solanki. Vidanalange Ishan Bandara became the second male boxer for Sri Lanka to claim a medal at the 2018 Commonwealth Games following Thiwanka Ranasinghe's bronze medal achievement.

References 

1991 births
Living people
Sri Lankan male boxers
Boxers at the 2018 Commonwealth Games
Commonwealth Games bronze medallists for Sri Lanka
Commonwealth Games medallists in boxing
Boxers at the 2018 Asian Games
Asian Games competitors for Sri Lanka
Flyweight boxers
20th-century Sri Lankan people
21st-century Sri Lankan people
Medallists at the 2018 Commonwealth Games